The Lady Stroh's Open was a golf tournament on the LPGA Tour from 1978 to 1979. It was played at the Dearborn Country Club in Dearborn, Michigan.

Winners
1979 Vicki Fergon
1978 Sandra Post

References

External links
Dearborn Country Club

Former LPGA Tour events
Golf in Michigan
Recurring sporting events established in 1978
Recurring sporting events disestablished in 1979
1978 establishments in Michigan
1979 disestablishments in Michigan
Dearborn, Michigan
History of women in Michigan